Dylan & the Dead is a collaborative live album by American singer-songwriter Bob Dylan and the Grateful Dead, released on February 6, 1989, by Columbia Records. The album consists of seven songs written and sung by Dylan, with the Grateful Dead providing accompaniment. The album was produced by Jerry Garcia and John Cutler.

Dylan & the Dead was recorded in 1987, during a successful stadium tour of the same name, that featured the two artists performing separately and together. Songs from two of the Grateful Dead's performances from the tour are documented on the album and video View from the Vault IV, and one of the tour-rehearsal songs is on the album Postcards of the Hanging.

Though ultimately poorly received, the album initially sold well, reaching  on the Billboard charts in the U.S.,  in the UK, and earning a Gold certification in the U.S.

In 1992, a bootleg of the first concert of the tour was released under the title "Orbiting Uvula". It includes the first-ever live performance of "Queen Jane Approximately", the first live performance of "John Brown" since 1963, and the first live performance of "Chimes of Freedom" since 1964.

Reception

Despite strong initial sales, the album was poorly received by critics. Rolling Stone stated that the record "makes you wonder what the fuss [over the tour] was about", although they did have some kind words for several of the tracks. Writing for The Village Voice, music critic Robert Christgau said that what Dylan "makes of his catalogue here is exactly what he's been making of it for years—money". Stephen Thomas Erlewine's review for AllMusic was particularly harsh, giving it one star out of a possible five, and calling it "quite possibly the worst album by either Bob Dylan or the Grateful Dead" and "a sad, disheartening document".

Track listing
All songs written by Bob Dylan except where noted.

Personnel

Musicians
Bob Dylan – guitar, vocals

Grateful Dead
Jerry Garcia – guitar, vocals, production
Mickey Hart – drums
Bill Kreutzmann – drums
Phil Lesh – bass guitar
Brent Mydland – keyboards, vocals
Bob Weir – guitar, vocals

Production
Guy Charbonneau – engineering
John Cutler – production, engineering
Joe Gastwirt – mastering
Herb Greene – photography
Rick Griffin – art direction
Gary Hedden – engineering
Peter Miller – engineering
David Roberts – engineering
Billy Rothschild – engineering
Chris Wiskes – engineering

See also
List of Grateful Dead covers

References

1989 live albums
Collaborative albums
Columbia Records live albums
Bob Dylan live albums
Grateful Dead live albums
Albums produced by Jerry Garcia
Albums with cover art by Rick Griffin